Victor Tsyplakov (born December 9, 1937 in Moscow, Russia) is a retired ice hockey player who played in the Soviet Hockey League. He played for HK Lokomotiv Moscow. He was inducted into the Russian and Soviet Hockey Hall of Fame in 1969.

External links
 Russian and Soviet Hockey Hall of Fame bio
 

1937 births
Soviet ice hockey forwards
Ice hockey people from Moscow
Living people
20th-century Russian people
Russian ice hockey forwards
EC KAC players
Soviet expatriate ice hockey players
Soviet expatriate sportspeople in Austria
Expatriate ice hockey players in Austria